Kazipet Junction railway station (station code:- KZJ) is located in Hanamkonda district of Telangana. It is a crucial railway junction connecting Northern and Southern India.

History 
With the completion of the Kazipet–Balharshah link in 1929, Chennai was directly linked to Delhi.

The Wadi–Secunderabad line was built in 1874 with financing by the Nizam of Hyderabad. It later became part of Nizam's Guaranteed State Railway. In 1889, the main line of the Nizam's Guaranteed State Railway was extended to Vijayawada, then known as Bezwada.

As of 1909, "From Wadi on the Great Indian Peninsula Railway, the Nizam's Guaranteed State Railway runs east to Warangal and then south-east towards Bezwada on the East Coast section of the Madras Railway."

Electrification 
The Dornakal–Kazipet sector was electrified in 1988–89, the Kazipet–Ramagundam sector in 1987–88 and the Kazipet–Secunderabad sector in 1991–93.

Amenities 
Kazipet railway station has computerized reservation counters, retiring room, waiting room, vegetarian and non-vegetarian refreshments and book stall.

Economy 

Coal freight from Singareni, Kothagudem, Ramagundam, Bellampalli and Balharshah mines account for around 40 per cent of the goods traffic handled by the railways in the Kazipet–Balharshah sector.

Developments 

The new line will be passing through Warangal, Ramagundam, Mancherial and Asifabad districts in Telangana, and through Chandrapur in Maharashtra. This will facilitate both the passenger traffic and goods movement that include cement, coal and food.

Loco sheds 
Kazipet Diesel Loco Shed houses WDM-2, WDM-3A, WDG-3A and WDG-4 locos. Opened in 2006, Kazipet Electric Loco Shed houses 100 WAG-7 & 72 WAG-9 locos. There is a coaching maintenance depot at Kazipet. Kazipet Junction diesel loco shed was selected to receive an international quality certificate in October 2017.

References

External links 
 More about WAGON Manufacture Unit
 Trains at Kazipet

Railway stations in Hanamkonda district
Secunderabad railway division
Railway junction stations in Telangana
Nizam's Guaranteed State Railway
Transport in Warangal